Moel Sych with a height of  is a subsidiary summit of Cadair Berwyn in north east Wales. It is the third highest summit in the Berwyn range after Cadair Berwyn and Cadair Berwyn North Top.

The summit lies at the triple historic county boundary point of Montgomeryshire, Denbighshire and Merionethshire. It is the highest point (historic county top) of Montgomeryshire.

The summit was often considered to be the highest summit in the Berwyns (and therefore the county top of Denbighshire as well as Montgomeryshire) until the Cadair Berwyn North Top, then known as Cadair Berwyn was found to be of the same height. Later on the OS discovered a new top in between the two, which was 5m higher at 832m. This top, now known as Cadair Berwyn, is listed as Cadair Berwyn New Top on the Nuttall list.

The summit has a cairn, and overlooks Llyn Lluncaws in the southern Cwm.

References

External links
 www.geograph.co.uk : photos of Cadair Berwyn and surrounding area

Hewitts of Wales
Mountains and hills of Denbighshire
Nuttalls
Highest points of Welsh counties
Mountains and hills of Powys